Ɽ, ɽ is a letter of the Latin alphabet, derived from R with the addition of a tail. Its capital form may be based on either the uppercase or lowercase R.

Unicode
The lowercase (ɽ) was added to Unicode since Unicode 1.0 while the uppercase (Ɽ) has only been added since Unicode 5.0.

Its codepoints are U+2C64 and U+027D, respectively.

Usage
 is used in the International Phonetic Alphabet to represent a retroflex flap.

Ɽ is also used in the alphabets of several Sudanese languages, including Heiban, Koalib, Moro and Otoro. It is placed after R in alphabetical order.

References

Latin-script letters
Phonetic transcription symbols